Jose Llana (born 5 May 1976) is a Filipino-American singer and actor best known for his roles on Broadway.

Biography
Born 5 May 1976, Llana, a native of Manila, Philippines, grew up in Springfield, Virginia, a suburb of Washington, D.C.  After graduating from Thomas Jefferson High School for Science and Technology in Alexandria, Virginia, Jose attended the Manhattan School of Music to study classical voice. During his freshman year he was discovered in an audition for the 1996 Revival of Rodgers and Hammerstein's The King and I and made his Broadway debut as Lun Tha starring opposite Lou Diamond Phillips and Donna Murphy.

He went on to star on Broadway as Angel in Rent, Jessie-Lee in Streetcorner Symphony, Wang Ta in Flower Drum Song opposite Lea Salonga, and as Chip Tolentino in The 25th Annual Putnam County Spelling Bee for which he and his cast won a 2005 Drama Desk Award for Best Ensemble Performance.  His Off-Broadway credits include Gabey in On the Town and  Saturn Returns, both at The Public Theater and Adam in Falling for Eve at The York Theater. His regional theater credits include the title role in Candide (Barrymore Award Nomination for Best Actor) and Tin Man Wong in The Ballad of Little Jo at the Steppenwolf Theater (Joseph Jefferson Award Nomination - Best Supporting Actor).  He toured the country in Cameron Mackintosh's Martin Guerre as Guillaume which went to The Kennedy Center after originating at The Guthrie Theater.

Llana has appeared on television in HBO's Sex and the City, alongside Margaret Cho and made his commercial debut as a computer salesman for Circuit City in 1999.  He appeared in the Sony Pictures 2005 feature film Hitch opposite Will Smith and Eva Mendes, as well as the independent film Unconscious.

Llana is also a best-selling recording artist in his native Philippines having recorded his debut solo album, Jose, in 2004 under the VIVA Philippines label.

Llana starred as El Gato in Wonderland: Alice's New Musical Adventure, which began performances on Broadway March 21, 2011 and officially opened on April 17, 2011.  The production closed on May 15, 2011, after 31 previews and 33 performances.

Llana has portrayed Ferdinand Marcos (2014 Lucille Lortel Award Nomination, Outstanding Lead Actor in a Musical) in David Byrne and Fat Boy Slim's Here Lies Love, directed by Alex Timbers, since the workshop production at Mass MoCA in North Adams, MA during the summer of 2012. Here Lies Love had its world premier production at The Public Theater in New York City on April 2, 2013, and was extended four times through July 28, 2013. The Off-Broadway commercial production of Here Lies Love opened at The Public Theater in New York City on May 1, 2014, and has performances through January 2015.

Llana co-starred as Bill Sikes in The Papermill Playhouse production of Oliver! in December 2013.

On March 12, 2015, Llana made his Lincoln Center American Songbook Concert Debut at the Stanley H. Kaplan Penthouse in New York.

On June 18, 2015, it was announced that Llana will succeed Ken Watanabe in the role of the King of Siam in Lincoln Center's Tony-winning revival of The King and I. Llana played an 11-week engagement in the role from July 14 to September 29.

Personal life
Llana was born in Manila, Philippines and immigrated with his family to Springfield, Virginia when he was 3 years old. He is gay and is married to his partner of 15 years, Erik Rose.

See also
 Filipinos in the New York City metropolitan region

References

External links
 Official Site

Llana appeared in the workshop production of the new musical, "Tales of the City," based on the first two books of Armistead Maupin's works.  The production was held at the Eugene O'Neill Center in Waterford Connecticut.  The composer is Jake Shears of Scissor Sisters, and the librettist is Jeff Whitty, of "Avenue Q" fame.

American tenors
1976 births
Living people
Filipino emigrants to the United States
Filipino musicians
Manhattan School of Music faculty
American male stage actors
American gay actors
Thomas Jefferson High School for Science and Technology alumni
21st-century American singers
21st-century American male singers
20th-century American singers
20th-century American male singers
21st-century American male actors
20th-century American male actors
Musicians from Manila
Male actors from Manila
People from Springfield, Virginia
Singers from Virginia
Male actors from Virginia